Cartonema parviflorum, commonly known in wiridjagu, is a herb in the Commelinaceae family.

It blooms between March and June producing yellow flowers.

It is found along watercourses, damp areas and in seasonally inundated areas in the Kimberley region in Western Australia where it grows in sandy-gravelly soils.

References

parviflorum
Plants described in 1869